Turkey Time may refer to:

 Turkey time (time in Turkey), the time zone of the Republic of Turkey
 Turkey Time (play), a 1931 British stage farce
 Turkey Time (1933 film), a 1933 British film farce
 Turkey Time (1970 film), a 1970 British television film by the BBC
 "Turkey Time", an episode of Rocko's Modern Life